Solimana may refer to:
Solimana (state), a former country in West Africa
Solimana (volcano), an extinct volcano in Peru
Solimana (Castilla), a mountain in Peru